Vidivelli is a 1960 Indian Tamil-language film written and directed by C. V. Sridhar. The film stars Sivaji Ganesan, B. Saroja Devi and M. N. Rajam; Ganesan also produced it under Prabhuram Pictures, a subsidiary of his own company Sivaji Films. The film focuses on a brother who steals a diamond necklace for his sister's happy life. But the necklace itself becomes a problem. The rest of the story deals with what is the secret of the necklace and how the brother solves this puzzle.

Vidivelli was released on 31 December 1960. The film was a critical and commercial success, running for over 100 days in theatres.

Plot 

Chandru has a sister Meena who is married to Ravi. But her in-laws insist on a diamond necklace, sans which she cannot join her husband. Hence, Chandru steals a diamond necklace with a locket and then Meena joins her husband. He and his mother move to Madras, where the former obtains employment. Chandru falls in love with his boss's daughter Chitra. One day, the necklace falls down and the locket opens, revealing the photograph of a man. Ravi and his family want to know who he is. Meena says she has never seen him before. But suspecting the worst, she is sent back to her old home.

After Chandru saves his boss from a large loss, the boss gives him a large sum of money in gratitude. Chandru purchases another necklace using that money and Meena goes back to her husband. However, Chandru's boss dismisses him to keep him away from Chitra. Chandru surrenders to the police station for the theft. He later realises that the earlier necklace belongs to Chitra, and the man in the locket is her brother who died at war. However, Chitra's father denies ever having had a son. The rest of the film deals with how the puzzle is solved.

Cast 

Male cast
 Sivaji Ganesan as Chandru
 S. V. Ranga Rao as the boss
 Balaji as Ravi
 T. R. Ramachandran as Babu
 M. R. Santhanam as Devit

Female cast
 B. Saroja Devi as Chithra
 M. N. Rajam as Meena
 Santha Kumari as Chandru's mother
 Padmini Priyadarshini as Rosie

Production 
In 1953, M. G. Ramachandran intended to produce a film titled Vidivelli with M. Karunanidhi writing; however, the project was dropped after Karunanidhi's arrest for participating in the Kallakudi demonstration that year. The title was later used for an unrelated film written and directed by C. V. Sridhar and produced by Sivaji Ganesan under Prabhuram Pictures, a subsidiary of his company Sivaji Films. Cinematography was handled by A. Vincent, editing by N. M. Shankar, and art direction by Ganga.

Soundtrack 
The soundtrack album was composed by A. M. Rajah while the lyrics were written by Kannadasan, A. Maruthakasi and Ku. Ma. Balasubramaniam.

Release and reception 
Vidivelli was released on 31 December 1960. In a review published on 8 January 1961, the critic from The Indian Express praised the performances of the cast, particularly Ganesan, Saroja Devi, Balaji and Santhakumari, and Vincent's cinematography. Kalki also appreciated the film for various aspects, including the story, direction and cast performances. The film was a critical and commercial success, running for over 100 days in theatres.

References

External links 
 

1960 films
1960s Tamil-language films
Films directed by C. V. Sridhar
Films with screenplays by C. V. Sridhar